The Kollanoor, Kollanore or Kollannur  is widely known Saint Thomas Christian family name. They originated in and around Palayoor, a village near Chavakkad in Thrissur District in Kerala, India and many migrated to Kunnamkulam.

History
The men from this family had successfully resisted Tipu Sultan from conquering the Cochin Kingdom.

Surnames
 Hindu Kollanoor Families
The Hindu Kollanoor family members hail from Kaiparambu (Thaikaadu) area near Thrissur. They are Namboothiri in caste (Malayali Brahmin) and now also worship in the family temple named Kollanoor Bhagawathy Temple, Anjoor, Near Mundoor.

 Christian Kollanoor Families
Although the family name is spawned among different religions, the majority of family members are now Christians. They belong to Astagrihas ( അഷ്ടഗൃഹങ്ങൾ prominent 8 Families evangelized by Thomas the Apostle). During an assault by Tippu Sultan in Kunnamkulam, the men (except the firstborns, who were considered as legal heirs) were sent to fight with Sultan's army and was brutally killed in the battleground which is now known as "Kollanoor Chantha" ( കൊള്ളന്നുർ ചന്ത ) near Perumpilavu. They refused conversion and became martyrs. The rest of the family members were rescued by Cochin Kingdom and were relocated in and around Thrissur in areas such as Kunnamkulam, Pazhanji, Velapaya, Avanoor, Koonamoochi, Parappur, Mattom, Kechery, etc. 

Baselios Mar Thoma Paulose II who was the 91st reigning Catholicos of the East and the Supreme Head of the Indian Orthodox Church belongs to Kollanoor family from Mangad.

Notable people
Baselios Mar Thoma Paulose II 91st Catholicos of the East and the Supreme Head of the Indian Orthodox Church.

See also

 Family name affixes
 List of Saint Thomas Christians
 Saint Thomas Christian
 Thrissur

References

1. Aithihyamaala by Kottarathil Sankunny

2. Keralathile christyanikal by Idamaruku.

3. Mooleppat-Kollannur charithram by Mathew-ittoop

External links
 reference of Astagrihas(families converted by St.Thomas)
 The Hindu: Ekalavyan passes away)

Indian surnames
Villages in Thrissur district